The Philadelphia Ramblers were a minor professional ice hockey team based in the Philadelphia Arena in Philadelphia, Pennsylvania. The Ramblers played for six seasons during the infancy of the American Hockey League from 1935 to 1941.

History
The Ramblers were formerly known as the Philadelphia Arrows from 1927 to 1935 and played in the Canadian-American Hockey League. The team changed named to the Ramblers for the 1935–36 season. The Canadian American Hockey League merged into the International-American Hockey League in 1936, where the Ramblers competed for another four seasons, before that league became known as the modern-day American Hockey League.

The Rangers ended the affiliation agreement after the 1940–41 season.

The team changed its name to the Philadelphia Rockets for the 1941–42 season, which turned out to be their final season.

Season-by-season results
 Philadelphia Arrows 1927–1935 (Canadian-American Hockey League)
 Philadelphia Ramblers 1935–1936 (Canadian-American Hockey League)
 Philadelphia Ramblers 1936–1940 (International-American Hockey League)
 Philadelphia Ramblers 1940–1941 (American Hockey League)
 Philadelphia Rockets 1941–1942 (American Hockey League)

Regular season

Playoffs

External links
Ramblers entry in A-Z Encyclopedia of Ice Hockey
Ramblers history
"A Brief History of The American Hockey League & Minor League Pro Hockey in Philadelphia: 1927 - 2005"

Defunct sports teams in Philadelphia
Canadian-American Hockey League teams
New York Rangers minor league affiliates
Defunct ice hockey teams in Pennsylvania